Frestonia was the name adopted by the residents of Freston Road, London, when they attempted to secede from the United Kingdom in 1977 to form the Free and Independent Republic of Frestonia. The residents were squatters, many of whom eventually set up a housing co-op in negotiation with Notting Hill Housing Trust, and included artists, musicians, writers, actors and activists. Actor David Rappaport was the Foreign Minister, while playwright Heathcote Williams served as Ambassador to the United Kingdom.

Location
Frestonia consisted of a  triangle of land (including communal gardens) formed by Freston Road, Bramley Road and Shalfleet Drive, W10, which belonged at the time to the London Borough of Hammersmith. This land crosses the boundary of London postal districts W10 (Kensal Green) and W11 (Notting Hill), and now belongs to the Royal Borough of Kensington and Chelsea.

Prior to the construction of the Westway, Freston Road had been called Latimer Road, and the nearby tube station still bears the former name.

Origins
Most of the residents of Freston Road were squatters, who moved into empty houses in the early 1970s. The "Republic of Frestonia" continued to operate as a collective well into the 1980s, becoming a creative hub for writers, artists and musicians as well as cultural activists. When the Greater London Council planned to redevelop the area, the 120 residents first all adopted the same surname of Bramley with the aim that the council would then have to re-house them collectively.

Independence
The Council threatened formal eviction, so at a public meeting attended by 200 people, resident Nicholas Albery—inspired by both the 1949 Ealing comedy film Passport to Pimlico and a previous visit to Freetown Christiania in Copenhagen—suggested that they declare the street independent of the rest of the UK. A referendum returned 94% of residents in favour of the plan, and 73% in favour of joining the European Economic Community. Independence was declared on 31 October 1977. Shadow Chancellor of the Exchequer Sir Geoffrey Howe wrote expressing his support, saying: "As one who had childhood enthusiasm for Napoleon of Notting Hill, I can hardly fail to be moved by your aspirations." In a legal dispute regarding the unauthorised performance of his play The Immortalist, Heathcote Williams won a ruling from the UK courts that Frestonia was for this purpose not part of the UK.

The state adopted the Latin motto Nos Sumus Una Familia—We are All One Family—and applied to join the United Nations, at the same time warning that peacekeeping troops might be needed to keep the GLC at bay.

Culture, communications, transport and economy

Frestonia had its own flag; postage stamps (which were honoured by the General Post Office), passport stamps for visitors, a national newspaper The Tribal Messenger, as well as an art gallery, The Car Breaker Gallery.

The Car Breaker Gallery's exhibitors included Joe Rush of the Mutoid Waste Company, Julie Umerle, Brett Ewins, Giles Leaman and Brendan McCarthy. The gallery opened to the public at 4 Bramley Road on 14 December 1979. In 1980, conceptual artist John Latham was a member of the audience at the private view of one of the performances presented there. Professional lighting for the gallery was donated by Sandy Nairne, later to be Director of the National Portrait Gallery.

Frestonia street art included a whale on Stoneleigh Street and a performance of Apocalypse Now on bicycles.

In addition, there was a "National Theatre" at Frestonia which performed Heathcote Williams's The Immortalist. The Frestonian National Film Institute was also formed; its first screening being—appropriately—Passport to Pimlico and a film of the Sex Pistols.

Local transport was served by the Number 295 bus, and the London Underground, Latimer Road underground station being at the north end of Bramley Road.

There were even plans to introduce a currency.

When the state celebrated its fifth anniversary in 1982, the population numbered 97 people occupying 23 houses. The same year, The Clash recorded their album Combat Rock in Ear Studios (also known as The People's Hall) in Frestonia. The Clash and Motörhead practised in the rehearsal studios there. Killing Joke and Girlschool also practised there.

Decline and fall
Following international press coverage, the residents formed the Bramleys Housing Co-operative Ltd, which negotiated with Notting Hill Housing Trust for continued residence and acceptable redevelopment of the site. Some Frestonians were unhappy with the consequent loss of independence and moved away. According to Tony Sleep, a resident photographer whose online photo-journal documents the history of the area, those leaving were often replaced by people with drinking and drug problems. The remaining Frestonians proved incapable of maintaining the ideals of the Frestonian "nation", which consequently went into decline. In its place, a more conventional local community developed, without any claims to secession from the UK.

Current situation
Bramleys Housing Co-operative manages the properties owned and built on the Frestonia site by Notting Hill Housing Trust, and its members live as a close-knit community. Some are children or grandchildren of the original Frestonians, although there has also been a significant influx of new residents.

A large new office development, also named Frestonia, was built on the adjacent site at the junction of Bramley Road and St Anns Road, and is occupied by the headquarters of Cath Kidston. A second large office development also named Frestonia by its developers was erected at 125/135 Freston Road in 2001.

Major developments occurred in the 2000s with the completion of headquarters for Monsoon Accessorize (2007) and TalkTalk (2009) at the rear of 91–121 Freston Road. The Louise T Blouin Foundation (2006) was built in nearby Olaf Street. The nearby 150,000 m2 Westfield London shopping complex opened in 2008.

Cultural reactions
1978. Simon Watters-Bramley, Frestonian Ambassador to Canada, the Arctic and Chicago, was featured on the cover of Salty Dog magazine (Vol. I, issue No. 2) an arts and culture tabloid newspaper published by Joanne Light in Wolfville, Nova Scotia, Canada where he resided at his ambassadorial residence before leaving his post to work for Greenpeace.
1995. Frestonia was the name of the final album from Aztec Camera.
2014. Robert Kerr won best Screenplay (UK) for his debut documentary The Republic of Frestonia at the 11th London Independent Film Festival.
2015. To the Bramley Family of Frestonia. A publication documenting the public art project in London by Turner Prize nominee Nathan Coley with an introduction by art critic, writer and curator Sacha Craddock.
2015. Arcadia. An article by Robert Barry, viewing Frestonia as the forefathers of Arcadia Spectacular.
2016. Robert Kerr's documentary The Republic of Frestonia was shortlisted for a Golden Trellick Award at the Portobello Film Festival.
2017. The Frestonian Gallery opened at The People's Hall. The Frestonian Gallery seeks to channel the independence of thought and expression of its rebel forebears.
2018. Welcome To Frestonia by Tony Sleep. Publisher: Frestonian Gallery. 
2020.  Kensington and Chelsea Art Week commission a mural to be painted on a large hoarding on Freston Road to commemorate the history of the area.
2021. The musical Ruff Tuff Cream Puff Estate Agency based on the story and events of Freston was created and premiered at the Belgrade Theatre, Coventry.

See also
 List of micronations

References

External links
 Tony Sleep's Photojournal Portfolio
 The Republic of Frestonia. Website

1977 disestablishments in England
1977 establishments in England
1977 in London
20th century in the Royal Borough of Kensington and Chelsea
Anarchism in the United Kingdom
Counterculture
Former unrecognized countries
Legalized squats
Micronations
Micronations in England
Squats in the United Kingdom